KP-161 is an experimental antiviral drug being studied for the treatment of HIV/AIDS.  It belongs to the class of nucleoside reverse transcriptase inhibitors.

KP-1461 is a prodrug of the active antiviral agent KP-1212.

References

Reverse transcriptase inhibitors
Experimental drugs
Prodrugs